Hakenfelde Prison (JVA Hakenfelde) is a low-security prison in Hakenfelde in Berlin, operated by the State of Berlin Department of Corrections. It was opened on 1 March 1978 in what was then West Berlin, and was originally a branch of Düppel Prison. It became an independent correctional institution in 1991. Between 1995 and 1998, its old barracks were replaced by a modern prison building. It has a capacity of 908 prisoners.

Several former communist leaders of East Germany served their sentences there, including Egon Krenz, Günter Schabowski, and Heinz Keßler.

References

Prisons in Germany
Buildings and structures in Berlin